The law of general average is a principle of maritime law whereby all stakeholders in a sea venture proportionately share any losses resulting from a voluntary sacrifice of part of the ship or cargo to save the whole in an emergency. For instance, should the crew jettison some cargo overboard to lighten the ship in a storm, the loss would be shared pro rata by both the carrier and the cargo-owners.

Code of Hammurabi Law 238 (c. 1755–1750 BC) stipulated that a sea captain, ship-manager, or ship charterer that saved a ship from total loss was only required to pay one-half the value of the ship to the ship-owner. In the Digesta seu Pandectae (533), the second volume of the codification of laws ordered by Justinian I (527–565) of the Eastern Roman Empire, a legal opinion written by the Roman jurist Paulus at the beginning of the Crisis of the Third Century in 235 AD  was included about the Lex Rhodia ("Rhodian law") that articulates the general average principle established on the island of Rhodes in approximately 1000 to 800 BC as a member of the Doric Hexapolis, plausibly by the Phoenicians during the proposed Dorian invasion and emergence of the purported Sea Peoples during the Greek Dark Ages (c. 1100–c. 750) that led to the proliferation of the Doric Greek dialect. The law of general average constitutes the fundamental principle that underlies all insurance.

In the exigencies of hazards faced at sea, crew members may have little time in which to determine precisely whose cargo they are jettisoning. Thus, to avoid quarreling that could waste valuable time, there arose the equitable practice whereby all the merchants whose cargo landed safely would be called on to contribute a portion, based upon a share or percentage, to the merchant or merchants whose goods had been tossed overboard to avert imminent peril.  General average traces its origins in ancient maritime law, and the principle remains within the admiralty law of most countries.

Ancient through early modern times

A form of what is now called general average was included in the Lex Rhodia, the Rhodes Maritime Code of circa 800 BC. Julius Paulus Prudentissimus quoted from the law around the turn of the 3rd century, and these quotes are preserved, and an excerpt is included in Justinian's 6th-century Digest of Justinian (part of the Corpus Juris Civilis), although the Lex Rhodia is itself now lost.

After the fall of Rome, formal maritime law fell into disuse in Europe (maritime law scholar Jean Marie Pardessus suggests that the Digest of Justinian may have been entirely lost until a copy was discovered in Amalfi around 1135), although informal arrangements similar to the basic concept of general average was probably often followed as a practical matter. The medieval Rolls of Oléron, probably a collection of judgments from a court in Bordeaux, provided (along with much else) guidance on what is now called general average, and was taken as authoritative in many parts of Europe: the Laws of Wisbuy, as well as laws of Flanders, the Hanseatic League, Amsterdam, Genoa, and Catalonia, appear to have been copied from the Rolls of Oléron.

An ordinance published by King Louis XIV of France in 1681 influenced laws in the rest of Europe, with the definition used in the French code followed in similar terms in codes and ordinances promulgated in that century and the next in Hamburg, Prussia, Denmark, Sweden, Spain, Amsterdam, Rotterdam and Middelburg.

York Antwerp Rules

The 1890 Rules
The first codification of general average was the York Antwerp Rules of 1890. American companies accepted it in 1949.  General average requires three elements which are clearly stated by Justice Grier in Barnard v. Adams:

"1st. A common danger: a danger in which vessel, cargo and crew all participate; a danger imminent and apparently 'inevitable', except by voluntarily incurring the loss of a portion of the whole to save the remainder."

"2nd. There must be a voluntary jettison, jactus, or casting away, of some portion of the joint concern for the purpose of avoiding this imminent peril, periculi imminentis evitandi causa, or, in other words, a transfer of the peril from the whole to a particular portion of the whole."

"3rd. This attempt to avoid the imminent common peril must be successful".

The York-Antwerp Rules remain in effect, having been modified and updated several times since their 1890 introduction.

Modern Rules
The York Antwerp Rules were updated in 1994, 2004 and 2016. The text of the 1994 Rules, those still in widest use, may be found here: A summary of the 2004 changes may be found here.

Modern day
Despite advances in maritime transport technology, General Average continues on occasion to be invoked: 
The MV Hyundai Fortune declared general average following an explosion and fire in 2006 off the coast of Yemen.  
The M/V MSC Sabrina declared general average in effect after grounding in the Saint Lawrence river on 8 March 2008. 
The owners of the Hanjin Osaka declared general average following an explosion in the ship's engine room on 8 January 2012. 
Maersk declared general average for Maersk Honam after a fire in the Arabian Sea in March 2018.
The owners of the Northern Jupiter declared general average following an engine fire on 28 January 2020.
Shoei Kisen, the owners of the Ever Given, declared general average following the grounding of the vessel in the Suez Canal on 23 March 2021, resulting in a six-day shutdown of traffic in the canal until it was freed by 11 tugs and two dredgers.
Evergreen Marine, the owners of the Ever Forward, declared general average on 31 March 2022 following the grounding of the vessel in Chesapeake Bay.

References

Further reading

External links
Definition of General Average, Duhaime's Law Dictionary

Admiralty law
Marine insurance